Allantoma is a genus of woody plant in the family Lecythidaceae first described as a genus in 1874. It is native to northwestern South America (Colombia, Venezuela, Peru, northern Brazil.

Species
 Allantoma decandra (Ducke) S.A.Mori, Ya Y.Huang & Prance - Peru, Brazil
 Allantoma integrifolia (Ducke) S.A.Mori - Amazonas State in Brazil
 Allantoma kuhlmannii (Ducke) S.A.Mori - Rondônia State in Brazil
 Allantoma lineata (Mart. ex O.Berg) Miers - Amazonas State in Venezuela; Amazonas and Pará States in Brazil
 Allantoma pachyantha (A.C.Sm.) S.A.Mori, Ya Y.Huang & Prance - Amazonas State in Brazil
 Allantoma pauciramosa (W.A.Rodrigues) S.A.Mori, Ya Y.Huang & Prance - Amazonas State in Brazil
 Allantoma pluriflora S.A.Mori, Ya Y.Huang & Prance - Colombia
 Allantoma uaupensis (Spruce ex O.Berg) S.A.Mori, Ya Y.Huang & Prance - Amazonas State in Brazil

References 

Lecythidaceae
Ericales genera